Sins of Madeleine (French: Dupont Barbès) is a 1951 French drama film directed by Henri Lepage and starring Madeleine Lebeau, Henri Vilbert and Yves Furet.

It was shot at the Epinay Studios in Paris. The film's sets were designed by the art director Claude Bouxin.

Cast
 Madeleine Lebeau as Malou 
 Henri Vilbert as Monsieur Archibald
 Yves Furet as Bobby
 Pierre-Louis as Henri
 Jean Sylvain as Emile le serveur
 Jane Marken as Mme Antonine 
 Lysiane Rey as La petite garce 
 Corinne Aix
 Robert Balpo
 Yvonne Dany
 Gérard Darrieu
 Robert Dock
 Michel Garland
 Claude Larue
 Christian Lude
 Mag-Avril
 Michel Nastorg
 Robert Noël
 Jacqueline Noëlle
 Philippe Olive
 Maryse Paillet

References

Bibliography 
 Maurice Bessy, André Bernard & Raymond Chirat. Histoire du cinéma français: 1951-1955. Pygmalion, 1989.

External links 
 

1951 drama films
French drama films
1950s French-language films
Films directed by Henri Lepage
Films set in Paris
French black-and-white films
Films scored by Joseph Kosma
1950s French films